Guernica is a 1950 French short film directed by Alain Resnais and Robert Hessens.

Synopsis
After a brief voice-over by Jacques Pruvost describing the bombing of Guernica on 26 April 1937, María Casares recites a poem by Paul Eluard on the subject of that atrocity, accompanied by imagery from numerous paintings, drawings, and sculptures produced by Pablo Picasso between 1920 and 1949, particularly Guernica (1937). The oppressive musical arrangements in the film were composed by Guy Bernard.

Home media
The short film is available as a special feature on the DVD edition of The Mystery of Picasso, Henri-Georges Clouzot's 1956 documentary about Picasso.

References

External links
 

1950 films
1950 short films
French short documentary films
1950s French-language films
Films directed by Alain Resnais
Bombing of Guernica
French documentary films
1950 documentary films
French black-and-white films
1950s short documentary films
1950s French films